The Sandpit (2020) is a novel by Nicholas Shakespeare.

Overview
The book is a thriller based in Oxford, England. It references the Phoenix school, based on the Dragon School in North Oxford, which Shakespeare attended in the 1960s. The Dragon is used as the name of a cinema, whereas there is actually a Phoenix Picturehouse not far from the Dragon School.

Reviews
The book has been reviewed in the following magazines and newspapers:

 The Canberra Times.
 Evening Standard.
 The Guardian.
 The Scotsman.
 The Spectator.
 The Sunday Telegraph.

See also
 List of books about Oxford

References

External links
The Sandpit by Nicholas Shakespeare
Amazon USA information
Amazon UK information

2020 British novels
Random House books
English thriller novels
Novels set in Oxford
Dragon School